The black-winged hatchetfish (Carnegiella marthae) is a freshwater ray-finned fish native to South America.

George Myers named this fish after his first wife Martha.

Description 
Black-winged hatchetfish has a convex body. It has a very deep ventral profile with its anal fin set back. This species has wing-like pectoral fins that often extend to half of the fish's body length. In general, coloration is silver with black patches and stripes but, depending on the angle of light, colors may vary. A stripe that is usually gold stretches horizontally from the gill cover the base of the tail.

Distribution and habitat 
Black-winged hatchetfish live in the calm streams and pools of the Orinoco and Negro region in South America.

Diet 
Black-winged hatchetfish are omnivorous. They can be fed live as well as flake foods. In the wild, they feed mainly at the surface for insects, but can also eat crustaceans.

In the aquarium 
Black-winged hatchetfish are peaceful fish that will do well with many other types of tropical fish such as smaller species of catfish and tetras. Make sure that there are small floating plants. Cover every hole at the top of the aquarium because in the wild, hatchetfish catch insects by jumping out of the water. Blackwinged hatchetfish inhabit the top of the aquarium.

See also 
 Freshwater hatchetfish

References 

Gasteropelecidae
Freshwater fish of South America
Taxa named by George S. Myers
Fish described in 1927